Jack Knight (born July 8, 1973) is an American songwriter and producer.  He is also a published author and founder of Made in East New York.

Biography
Originally from Brooklyn, New York, United States, Knight moved with his grandparents to Chesapeake, Virginia, at the age of 17.  As a teenager, he performed in a local rap group, and then signed as a solo artist to Def Jam Recordings in 1995.  His voice was first heard on Monifah's "Touch It", but he has been a songwriter since 1996.

As the first songwriter signed to Sean "Diddy" Combs publishing company in 1998, Knight has written, recorded and produced hit records for artists like Matisyahu, Lil' Kim, Usher, Keyshia Cole, Diddy, Jennifer Lopez, Christina Aguilera, Biggie, Total, Carl Thomas, Chico DeBarge, Rakim, Monifah, Blackstreet, Lyric, Faith Evans, Tamia and many others.

He also started Finding Your Way Worldwide, which has been implemented in Washington Heights, Harlem, London, Stockholm, Sweden, Canada, East New York, and Richmond, Virginia where it's based. Finding Your Way is a music program that teaches kids the significance of incorporating and promoting social change in their homes, communities and environment.

"My calling is also giving, teaching and empowering the youth," he says. "This is something else I do on the side besides my job as a songwriter. It’s more than me that I am trying to help. It’s a group of youth that I’m trying to teach life skills through music. This program can revolutionize the way teachers teach urban youth and the way kids with a learning disability learn."

In his 2006 book, The Art of Writing A Hit Song: The Urban Experience, Jack breaks down the process of creating and developing a hit song in seven formulated steps.  He also offers online songwriting courses through The Jack Knight Songwriters Academy, which employs an intense curriculum to prepare up and coming songwriters for the mainstream media.

In 1999, Knight decided to move into the realm of recording, releasing his debut album, Gypsy Blues, on Universal Records. He was the first writer signed to Sean 'Diddy' Combs publishing company, the Writing Factory, where he continues to write, record, and produce on a regular basis.

More recently, Knight traveled to Europe and Africa to collaborate with musicians there and also to promote social change and education for young people around the world. He is completing a DVD of his travels called Finding Your Way: Through The Art of Songwriting to document his mission. In addition, he is at work on new projects for his new record Label Made In East New York.

Selected songwriting discography

1997
 Virgin by Chico DeBarge

1998
 Touch It 
 Shorty (You Keep Playin' with My Mind) by Imajin

1999
 Sittin' Home by Total (girl group)

2001
 Can't Believe (feat. Carl Thomas) by Faith Evans
 Dance With Me by Jennifer Lopez
 Walking On Sunshine by Jennifer Lopez
 I Need A Girl Part 1 (feat. Usher & Loon) by Sean Combs

2005
 Kronik (feat. Snoop Dogg) by Lil' Kim
 Hustler's Story (feat. Akon, Scarface (rapper), Big Gee) by The Notorious B.I.G.

2006
 Tell Me (feat. Christina Aguilera)

2007
 Let It Go

2012
 Live Like A Warrior by Matisyahu

2015
 Last Night (feat. Keyshia Cole) by Sean Combs
 Old Thing Back (feat. The Notorious B.I.G. and Ja Rule) by Matoma

2019
 U Say (feat. 6lack) by The Bonfyre

Records sold
 Ma’hogany (album) by Monifah – 500,000+
 Total (girl group), Lil’ Kim, Keyshia Cole – 500,000+
 Press Play by Sean Combs – 500,000+
 Faithfully – 500,000+
 Hurt No More by Mario Winans – 500,000+
 Carl Thomas 500,000+
 The 18th Letter by Rakim – 500,000+
 Long Time No See by Chico DeBarge – 500,000+
 Better Days – 500,000+
 Full Clip: A Decade of Gang Starr – 500,000+
 Finally – 500,000+
 Day26 – 500,000+ 
 Living Legends by 8Ball & MJG –  500,000+
 J to tha L-O The Remixes – 4 million
 Keyshia Cole – 2 million
 It Was All a Dream – 1 million 
 Wild Wild West – 2 million 
 Greatest Hits – 1 million
 We Invented the Remix by Sean Combs – 1 million 
 Duets: The Final Chapter by The Notorious B.I.G. – 1 million 
 The One – 1 million
 Forever – 1 million
 Hard Core – 2.7 million
 Danity Kane – 2 million
 Let It Go – 1 million

References

External links
Interview, HitQuarters Nov 2006

Living people
Songwriters from New York (state)
1973 births